Loris Palazzo (born 9 February 1991) is an Italian footballer who plays for Bitonto.

Honours

Club 
 Monza
Serie D: 2016-17
Scudetto Dilettanti: 2016-17

References

External links

Italian footballers
Association football fullbacks
Footballers from Bari
1991 births
Living people
S.S. Fidelis Andria 1928 players
A.S. Bisceglie Calcio 1913 players
Calcio Foggia 1920 players
Manfredonia Calcio players
U.S. Bitonto players
A.C. Monza players
S.S.C. Bari players
Latina Calcio 1932 players
S.S.D. Città di Brindisi players
S.S.D. Audace Cerignola players
Serie C players
Serie D players